The 1940 PGA Championship was the 23rd PGA Championship, held August 26 to September 2 at Hershey Country Club in Hershey, Pennsylvania, east of Harrisburg.  Then a match play championship, Byron Nelson won his first PGA Championship, defeating Sam Snead 1 up in the 36-hole final. It was the third of Nelson's five major titles; he won the PGA Championship again in 1945. From 1939 to 1945, Nelson made five of the six finals, missing only in 1942 (not held in 1943).

Defending champion and host professional Henry Picard lost in the third round to Gene Sarazen. Also out in the third round was five-time champion Walter Hagen, age 47, in his last PGA Championship match. He gained his last win in the second round over Vic Ghezzi, the champion the following year in 1941. Hagen ended his career with a 40–10 match record in the event. He played one last time at age 49 in the qualifier in 1942, but did not advance to match play.

Heavy rains on Saturday stopped play halfway through the semifinals which were completed on Sunday; the final round was pushed back to Monday, which was Labor Day.

Dick Metz was the medalist in the stroke play qualifier at 140 (−6); he lost 2 & 1 in the third round to Nelson. Two-time champion Denny Shute qualified at 151, but was rushed to a local hospital for an emergency appendectomy that night.

Format
The match play format at the PGA Championship in 1940 called for 12 rounds (216 holes) in seven days:
 Monday and Tuesday – 36-hole stroke play qualifier, 18 holes per day;
defending champion and top 63 professionals advanced to match play
 Wednesday – first two rounds, 18 holes each
 Thursday – third round – 36 holes
 Friday – quarterfinals – 36 holes
 Saturday – semifinals – 36 holes (finished on Sunday)
 Sunday – final – 36 holes (played on Monday)

Past champions in the field

Failed to qualify

Source:

Final results
Monday, September 2, 1940

Source:

Final eight bracket

Final match scorecards
Morning

Afternoon

Source:

References

External links
PGA Media Guide 2012
PGA.com – 1940 PGA Championship

PGA Championship
Golf in Pennsylvania
Hershey, Pennsylvania
PGA Championship
PGA Championship
PGA Championship
PGA Championship
PGA Championship